Rasulpur Taluk is one of the thirteen blocks of the Jajpur district in Odisha state, India. National Highway 5 passes through the block.

Villages
Villages in Rasulpur Taluk include:
 Rasulpur
 Orali
 Garipur
 Sarangpur
 Barans
 Mugpal
 Narsinghpur,(Famous for Rahasakunja Yatra on the occasion of Kartika purnima in every year) Revenue Villeage
Haripurhat is a major business Hub in Jajpur District

Villages in Jajpur district
Tehsils of India